The Indore - Dahod railway line of the Western Railway Zone is an under construction public transit system in the state of Madhya Pradesh and Gujarat. It will connect Indore with Dahod on Mathura–Vadodara section. This line will reduce the distance between Indore and Dahod by 100 km.

History 

The Project was allocated in 2008 but the work on the line started very late has 8 tunnels to be built. The later number of tunnels was reduced to three as of April 2019.

The cost of the Indore-Dahod railway line is 1643 crores this may increase as per requirements as Railways have set a targeted to complete the Indore - Dahod Line project by 2022 as of now 11 years had passed 50 percent work of the work has not been completed.

Route and halts

See also

 Manmad–Indore line
 Western Railway
 Indore Junction railway station
 Mathura–Vadodara section
 Chhota Udaipur–Dhar line

References

Transport in Indore
Railway lines in Gujarat
Rail transport in Madhya Pradesh
Transport in Dahod
Proposed railway lines in India